Nana Aisha Abdullahi (c. 1960 – 5 March 2014) was a Nigerian judge and lawyer. In 2010, Abdullahi became Jigawa State's first female High Court judge. (Jigawa is a state located in northern Nigeria.)

Abdullahi served as the Solicitor General, Attorney General and Commissioner for Justice from 2000 to 2005. She was appointed to the High Court in 2010, becoming the first woman to serve as a High Court justice in Jigawa. She held the post until her death in 2014.

Justice Nana Abdullahi died from an illness at a private hospital in Dutse, Jigawa, Nigeria, on 5 March 2014, at the age of 54. She was survived by her husband, Abubakar, a coordinator at the Dutse campus of the National Open University of Nigeria.

References

1960s births
2014 deaths
Nigerian women judges
20th-century Nigerian lawyers
People from Jigawa State
21st-century Nigerian judges
21st-century women judges